Class Cruise is an American teen comedy television film that premiered on NBC on October 22, 1989. The film was directed by Oz Scott and written by Steven Long Mitchell and Craig W. Van Sickle.

Plot
A group of Mensa high school students are rewarded for their academic efforts by going on a 14-week ocean cruise. However, the students encounter another group of students, who are known for their unruly behavior. The two groups clash due to their different academic and social classes.

Cast
 Billy Warlock as Sam McBride
 Jordan Brady as Randy
 Michael DeLuise as Boz Crenshaw
 Andrea Elson as Staci Poston
 Richard Moll as Saunders
 Marc Price as Arnold Guy
 McLean Stevenson as Miles Gimrich
 Brooke Theiss as Kim Robbins
 Kathryn Marcopulos as Bev Bunns
Gigi as Bikini Babe
Frances Bay as Grandma

References

External links

American teen comedy films
NBC network original films
Seafaring films
Films directed by Oz Scott
1989 films
1980s American films